This is a discography of the Jazz trombonist J. J. Johnson (January 22, 1924 – February 4, 2001).

As leader/co-leader 
 1949: J. J. Johnson's Jazz Quintets (Savoy, 1950s)[LP] – J. J. Johnson Savoy singles and EPs from 1946–49
1949: Modern Jazz Trombones (Prestige) –  B-side of 10 inch album, released 1951.  Kai Winding on A-side 
1949: J. J. Johnson with Sonny Stitt (Prestige) –  also issued as part of 1951's, 10 inch Modern Jazz Trombones Volume Two.  Also reissued in 1957 as part of Sonny Stitt/Bud Powell/J. J. Johnson
1952: Jazz South Pacific (Regent / Savoy)
1953: Jay Jay Johnson with Clifford Brown,… (Blue Note) – re-issued as The Eminent Jay Jay Johnson Volume 1
1953: Jazz Workshop, Volume One: Trombone Rapport with Kai Winding, Bennie Green, Willie Dennis  (Debut Records)
1953: Jazz Workshop, Volume Two: Trombone Rapport (Debut, 1955) – more recordings from the 1953 Jazz Workshop sessions 
1953: Four Trombones (Debut) – third release (in 1957) of recordings from the 1953 Jazz Workshop sessions 
1954: The Eminent Jay Jay Johnson, Vol. 2 (Blue Note)
1955: The Eminent Jay Jay Johnson, Vol. 3 (Blue Note) 
1956: J Is for Jazz (Columbia) 
1957: First Place (Columbia)
1957: Blue Trombone (Columbia) 
1957: Dial J. J. 5 (Columbia) 
1957: Stan Getz and J. J. Johnson at the Opera House (Verve) 
 1958: J. J. in Person! (Columbia, 1958)
 1959: Really Livin' (Columbia, 1959)
 1960: Trombone and Voices (Columbia, 1960)
 1960: J.J. Inc. (Columbia, 1961)
 1961: A Touch of Satin (Columbia, 1962)
 1961: André Previn and J. J. Johnson with André Previn (Columbia, 1962)
 1963: J.J.'s Broadway (Verve, 1963)
 1964: Proof Positive (Impulse!, 1964)
 1964: J.J.! (RCA Victor, 1965)
 1965: Goodies (RCA Victor, 1966)
 1965: Broadway Express (RCA Victor, 1966)
 1966: The Total J.J. Johnson (RCA Victor, 1967)
 1977: The Yokohama Concert with Nat Adderley (Pablo, 1978) – live
 1977: Chain Reaction: Yokohama Concert, Vol. 2 with Nat Adderley (Pablo, 2002)
 1979: Pinnacles (Milestone, 1980)
 1980: Concepts in Blue (Pablo, 1981)
 1982: Aurex Jazz Festival ’82 All Star Jam with Clark Terry, Kai Winding, Dexter Gordon, et al. (East Worl, 1982) – live
 1983: Jackson, Johnson, Brown and Company with Milt Jackson, Ray Brown, et al. (Fantasy, 1983)
 1984: We'll Be Together Again with Joe Pass  (Pablo, 1984)
 1984: Things Are Getting Better All the Time with Al Grey (Pablo, 1984)
 1988: Quintergy (Antilles, 1991) – live
 1988: Standards (Antilles, 1991) – live
 1992?: Vivian (Concord, 1992)
 1992: Let's Hang Out (Verve, 1993)
 1994: Tangence with the Robert Farnon Orchestra  (Verve, 1995)
 1996: The Brass Orchestra (Verve, 1997)
 1996: Heroes (Verve, 1998)

As co-leader with Kai Winding 
 1954: Jay & Kai (Savoy, 1954)[10"]
 1954: An Afternoon at Birdland ("X", 1955) 
 1954: Jay and Kai – Dec. 3, 1954 (Prestige, 1955)[10"]
 1955: K + J.J. (Bethlehem, 1955) – reissued as Nuf Said (1959), The Finest of K & J.J. (1976) and Kai & Jay! (Affinity, 1986)
 1955: Trombone for Two (Columbia, 1956)
 1956: Jay and Kai + 6, The Jay and Kai Trombone Octet (Columbia, 1956)
 1956: Dave Brubeck and Jay & Kai at Newport (Columbia, 1956) – live. Johnson on the last three tracks only.
 1955–57: Jay and Kai (Columbia, 1957)[10"]
 1960: The Great Kai & J. J. (Impulse!, 1960)
 1968: Israel (A&M/CTI, 1968)
 1968–69: Betwixt & Between (A&M/CTI, 1969)
 1969: Stonebone (A&M/CTI (Japan), 1970)

As sideman 

With Count Basie
 The Bosses (Pablo, 1973) 
 Basie Jam (Pablo, 1974) – rec. 1973
 Kansas City 7 (Pablo, 1980)

With Miles Davis
 Birth of the Cool (Capitol, 1949)
 Young Man with a Horn (Blue Note, 1952)
 Walkin' (Prestige, 1954)
 Miles Davis Volume 1 (Blue Note, 1956)
 Miles Davis Volume 2 (Blue Note, 1956)

With Dizzy Gillespie
 The Complete RCA Victor Recordings (Bluebird, 1995) – rec. 1937–49
 Dee Gee Days: The Savoy Sessions (Savoy, 1976) – rec. 1951–52
 Afro (Norgran, 1954)
 Dizzy and Strings (Norgran, 1954)
 Perceptions (Verve, 1961) - composer and arranger

With Oliver Nelson
Happenings with Hank Jones (Impulse!, 1966)
Encyclopedia of Jazz (Verve, 1966)
The Sound of Feeling (Verve, 1966)

With Sonny Rollins
 Sonny Rollins, Vol. 2 (Blue Note, 1957)
Alfie (Impulse!, 1966)

With Lalo Schifrin
New Fantasy (Verve, 1964)
Once a Thief and Other Themes (Verve, 1965)

With Sonny Stitt
Sonny Stitt Plays Arrangements from the Pen of Quincy Jones (Roost, 1955)
The Matadors Meet the Bull (Roulette, 1965)
What's New!!! (Roulette, 1966)

With others
 Cannonball Adderley, Julian "Cannonball" Adderley (EmArcy, 1955)
 Nat Adderley, Sayin' Somethin' (Atlantic, 1966)
 Manny Albam, The Soul of the City (Solid State, 1966)
 Kenny Burrell, Night Song (Verve, 1969)
 Donald Byrd, I'm Tryin' to Get Home (Blue Note, 1964)
 Ron Carter, New York Slick (Milestone, 1979)
 Paul Desmond, Summertime (A&M/CTI, 1968)
 Kenny Dorham, Afro-Cuban (Blue Note, 1955)
 Ella Fitzgerald, At the Opera House (Verve, 1957)
 Benny Golson, The Modern Touch (Riverside, 1957)
 Coleman Hawkins, The Hawk Flies High (1957)
 Billie Holiday, Lady in Satin (Columbia, 1958)
 Milt Jackson, Bebop (East West, 1988)
 Elvin Jones, And Then Again (Atlantic, 1965)
 John Lewis, The Modern Jazz Society Presents a Concert of Contemporary Music (Norgran, 1955)
 Howard McGhee, Howard McGhee, Vol. 1 (Blue Note, 1950)
 Jimmy McGriff The Big Band (Solid State, 1966)
 Chico O'Farrill, Nine Flags (Impulse!, 1966)
 Charlie Parker, Charlie Parker on Dial (Dial, 1947)
 Moacir Santos, Carnival of the Spirits (Blue Note, 1975)
 Horace Silver, The Cape Verdean Blues (Blue Note, 1965)
 Steve Turre, Steve Turre (Verve, 1996)
 Stanley Turrentine, Joyride (Blue Note, 1965)

Soundtracks
Man And Boy (Sussex, 1971) – with Quincy Jones featuring Bill Withers 
Across 110th Street (United Artists, 1972) – with Bobby Womack
 Top of the Heap (Fanfare Corp. & St. John Unlimited Prod., 1972) with Christopher St. John 
Cleopatra Jones (Warner, 1973) – with Joe Simon featuring Millie Jackson 
Willie Dynamite (MCA, 1974) – featuring Martha Reeves & The Sweet Things

Other notable recordings
The Birdlanders, Vol. 1, ...Vol. 2, ...Vol. 3 (Period, 1954) – with Henri Renaud, Al Cohn, Milt Jackson, …
Aurex Jazz Festival '82 - Live Special (East World, 1982) 
Carnegie Hall Salutes the Jazz Masters (Verve, 1994)

References

J. J. Johnson, A Comprehensive Discography… by Louis George Bourgois
The Musical World of J. J. Johnson by Joshua Berret and Louis G. Bourgois III
The Jazz Discography Project, www.jazzdisco.org
www.discogs.com

 
Jazz discographies
Discographies of American artists